Khanak may refer to:
 Khanak, ancient IVC village and hill mine in Bhiwani district of Haryana in India
 Khanak, Markazi
 Khanak, Sistan and Baluchestan